Newcastle Central Station (also known simply as Newcastle and locally as Central Station) is a major railway station in Newcastle upon Tyne. It is the primary national rail station serving Newcastle upon Tyne, with local rail services provided by the Tyne and Wear Metro network to which the station is connected to by Central Station Metro station, situated beneath the national rail station.

The main line serving the station is the East Coast Main Line from London to Edinburgh via Yorkshire and Newcastle. TransPennine Express maintains a frequent service to Liverpool and Manchester, and CrossCountry provides services to the West Midlands and South West of England. The station is also on the Durham Coast Line which provides commuter connections to Gateshead, Sunderland, Hartlepool, and Middlesbrough. Additionally, the station is served by the Tyne Valley Line to Hexham and Carlisle. Direct destinations from the station include London, Edinburgh, Aberdeen, Glasgow, Manchester, Liverpool, Leeds, Durham, Birmingham, York, Darlington, Bristol, Reading, and Plymouth.

The station opened in August 1850, as part of the then Newcastle & Carlisle Railway and York, Newcastle & Berwick Railway. Now a Grade I listed building, it is located in the city's Grainger Town area, to the west of the Castle Keep. In Simon Jenkins' Britain's 100 Best Railway Stations, the station was one of only ten to be awarded five stars.

Construction and opening

Conception
A scheme for a central station was proposed by Richard Grainger and Thomas Sopwith in 1836 but was not built.

The Newcastle and Carlisle Railway had agreed to relinquish their insistence on exclusively using their Redheugh terminus on the south bank of the River Tyne. They agreed with George Hudson on a general station north of the Tyne, near the Spital. Instead of crossing the Tyne by a low level bridge and climbing to the Spital by a rope-worked incline, they would build an extension crossing at Scotswood and approaching on the north bank. They opened this line and a temporary station at Forth, and passenger trains started using that on 1 March 1847.

Hudson, known as the "Railway King" was concentrating on connecting his portfolio of railways so as to join Edinburgh with the English network. His Newcastle and Berwick Railway obtained its authorising Act of Parliament in 1845, but for the time being it was to use the Newcastle and North Shields Railway's station at Carliol Square. Building a crossing of the Tyne was obviously going to be a lengthy process, so that he gave the construction of the general station a low priority. The Tyne crossing became the High Level Bridge.

In February 1846 the Newcastle and Carlisle Railway exerted pressure for the general station to be built, and the architect John Dobson was appointed by Hudson to design it, in association with the engineer T E Harrison, and Robert Stephenson. Gibson Kyle was clerk of works. By now the general alignment of Hudson's railways was becoming clear: a main line from the south via Gateshead would approach over the High Level Bridge and enter the general station from the east; the Newcastle and Berwick line would be extended from Carliol Square and also enter from the east; through trains from London to Scotland would reverse in the new station. Newcastle and Carlisle Railway trains would of course enter from the west.

A definite design

Dobson produced general plans for the station, now being referred to as the Central station, on a broad curve to front Neville Street so as to accommodate the alignment of the approaching railways at east and west. It was to a "Romano-Italien design with ornamental work of the Doric order". Two through platform lines were shown, with three west end bays and two at the east end. There were to be three trainshed roofs with spans of 60 feet. Extensive offices as well as refreshment facilities were shown, and there was to be a covered carriage drive on the Neville Street side extending from the porte-cochère at each end.

On 7 August 1847 a contract was let for the main part of the work to Mackay and Blackstock, for £92,000. A considerable amount of groundworks was necessary on the large site prior to the actual building work.

The work did not progress speedily, and in 1849 Hudson's collection of railway companies suffered a financial shock. At a time of more difficult trading and a tighter money market, Hudson's personal dealings were exposed as shady. The York, Newcastle and Berwick Railway had been formed by merger of the previous smaller companies, and the YN&BR wished to reduce the financial commitment to the Central Station substantially; hotel accommodation and the covered carriage drive were eliminated. One of the through platforms was also removed from the plan.

As built the site covered three acres and the length of the platform faces was 830 yards.

Inaugurated by the Queen

The trainshed proved faster to construct and on 29 August 1850 Queen Victoria visited the station by train and formally opened it. The day was declared a public holiday in Newcastle. The following day YN&BR trains were diverted into it.

The trainshed was, jointly with the Lime Street station in Liverpool, the first to be designed and built in Britain using curved wrought iron ribs to support an arched roof. The large section of the ribs was fabricated using curved web plates specially rolled using bevelled rolls; the novel technique was created by Thomas Charlton of Hawks Crawshay, and was estimated to have saved 14% on the cost of the roof ironwork, compared with cutting rectilinear plates to the curve.

The station was lit by gas; a demonstration of electric arc-lighting was made, but was not at that date a practical possibility for the large station space. The platforms were positioned 15 inches above rail level.

The Newcastle and Carlisle Railway started using Central station from 1 January 1851, and also abandoned its earlier terminus at Forth.

In 1861 the York, Newcastle and Berwick Railway had already merged with others to form the North Eastern Railway, and now it was desired to amalgamate with the Newcastle and Carlisle Railway too. The Corporation of Newcastle used the opportunity of the necessary Parliamentary Bill for the amalgamation to insist on construction of the abandoned porte-cochère, and this was designed by Thomas Prosser and completed in 1863.

Expansion of the station
In the 1860s the passenger train service was increasing considerably, especially as branch lines opened, six platforms were increased to nine in 1871 and to twelve in 1877, and then to fifteen in 1894: an additional through island platform was provided in 1871, occupying space formerly in use for stabling carriages. Increase in traffic continued, as also increasing train lengths and it was clear that a major extension of the station was essential. Newcastle had been given city status in 1882 and was supportive of the work, seeing it as a civic improvement. Forth Street was displaced southwards and two new trainshed roofs covered a southward extension of the station; in addition a large expansion to the east took place, with additional bay platforms there on the north side of the former bays. The original through track was blocked to form east and west bays, so that there were still only three through platform lines. This work was completed in 1894.

The new group of bay platforms at the east end had their own concourse quadrangle, known at the time as the "Tynemouth Square". There was a separate booking hall for those local services. At this stage the roof covered seven and a half acres in area; there were fifteen platforms with a length of 3,000 yards.

Killingworth Billy
In 1901 an early steam locomotive was on display at the station:

[The station] is further graced by a pedestal on which stands a curious old locomotive rejoicing in the name of "Billy". The true early history of "Billy" is well-nigh veiled in the mists of antiquity, and it was only by diligent enquiry that Mr Holliday, the Station Master, was able to learn a little of her antecedents. That "she" was constructed as far back as 1824 – 1826 is however certain, and on that score alone she is entitled to an introduction to such of the readers of the Railway Magazine as have until now been unaware of her existence. For about fifty-five years (until 1879) she performed good service, first at the Springwell, and latterly at the Killingworth colliery, from which place she actually steamed into Newcastle in 1881 to celebrate George Stephenson’s Centenary.

An image of the locomotive in Bywell's article is captioned "Puffing billy" but it is not Puffing Billy of 1814, which is currently on display at the Science Museum in London.

The locomotive in Bywell's article is known simply as Billy (Built in 1826). It was presented to Newcastle upon Tyne Corporation for preservation in 1881. Initially it was displayed on a plinth at the north end of the High Level Bridge, but was moved to the interior of Newcastle Central Station in 1896; it remained there until 1945, when it was moved to the city's Museum of Science and Industry; it was moved again in 1981 to the Stephenson Railway Museum in nearby North Shields, where it is still on display.

The early history of the locomotive is uncertain; it is probably a George Stephenson locomotive, and was probably built at Killingworth Colliery workshops around 1815–1820.

The twentieth century

In 1900 the North Eastern Railway started replacing the gas lighting in the station with electric arc equipment. Further use of electricity came from 1904 when several suburban lines were electrified using the third rail system, to form the Tyneside Electrics system, electric trains were introduced, using Central Station from 1 July 1904.

Another major development came on 1 October 1906 when the King Edward VII Bridge was opened, crossing the Tyne to the south-west of the station: Since 1850 East Coast Main Line trains had entered Newcastle from the south via the High Level Bridge to the south-east, this meant however that they had to reverse in order to continue their journey, which lengthened journey times and led to congestion at the busy junction east of the station. The four-track King Edward Bridge remedied this by allowing north–south trains to leave or enter from either side of the station.

Metro station
The Tyne and Wear Metro system opened in 1980, taking over and improving many of the Tyneside suburban routes that had declined under British Railways management. The underground Central Station for Metro trains was constructed during the late 1970s underneath the main line station, and opened in 1981. Part of the porte-cochère was temporarily dismantled while excavation work took place. The Metro system was a considerable success; Many conventional rail services were transferred there, and several of the east end bays were closed and converted to car parking and other usage. The Carlisle line was diverted to enter Newcastle over the King Edward Bridge of 1906, and a large out-of-town shopping development, the Metro Centre, was opened with a station on that line. The changing pattern of railway services meant that terminating trains were significantly fewer and through trains had increased. The emphasis on bay platforms at the station was no longer appropriate.

The opportunity was taken in conjunction with the East Coast Main Line electrification scheme, inaugurated in 1991 by British Rail, to extend the station southwards to provide more through platforms. This encroached on to land occupied by through tracks previously used by goods trains, which had seen little use since the withdrawal of many goods services in the 1960s. A new island platform was provided, built around the southern wall of the station. The two platform faces are divided so as to provide four numbered platforms, 5 to 8, generally used for local trains.

Train services 

Newcastle is a principal stop on the East Coast Main Line. The station is operated by London North Eastern Railway.

London North Eastern Railway
London North Eastern Railway provides high-speed inter-city services southbound every half-hour to London (one fast, one semi-fast) as well as 3 trains per 2 hours continue northbound into Scotland. One service is also provided each evening Monday - Friday from Newcastle to Sunderland.

At weekends, all daytime services arriving from London continue to Edinburgh. 
4 services are extended daily to  
1 service is extended daily to 
1 service is extended daily to 
1 service is extended daily to Stirling
1 fast service calling at Darlington and York only with a journey time of 2 hours 50 minutes.
Additional services operate between Edinburgh-Newcastle/York and between Newcastle-York.
Rolling stock used: Class 800s, Class 801s

Flying Scotsman
early-morning service, the Flying Scotsman operated by London North Eastern Railway, from Edinburgh Waverley to London King's Cross calling at Newcastle only, arriving King's Cross at 09.40; no corresponding northbound service

Rolling stock used: Class 800s

CrossCountry
CrossCountry operates services north into Scotland, supplementing London North Eastern Railway services, and southbound there are two trains per hour to the CrossCountry hub at Birmingham New Street, from where they extend towards the South West and South Coast.
northbound to Edinburgh Waverley hourly, continuing to Glasgow Central (every two hours) or Aberdeen (once daily), calling at most stations en route. 
Rolling stock used: Class 220s, Class 221s and InterCity 125s

TransPennine Express
Newcastle is a terminus for TransPennine Express services to and from Manchester and also sees services from Liverpool call at the station heading towards Edinburgh.

With the electrification of the Manchester to Liverpool Line, from May 2014 a new timetable was introduced which is made up an hourly express service between Newcastle and Liverpool via Leeds and Manchester reducing journey times to Liverpool to three hours as part of the Northern Hub scheme. Services to Leeds/York are also supplemented by London North Eastern Railway and CrossCountry.
northbound to Edinburgh Waverley calling at Morpeth only.

Rolling stock used: Class 802 bi-mode multiple units

Northern Trains

Northern Trains operates a number of commuter and regional services :
Extended to Carlisle at peak hours.
1 train per hour operates between Newcastle and Metro Centre calling at Dunston only during the day.

Rolling stock used: Class 156 and Class 158 diesel multiple units

Lumo
In October 2021, Lumo commenced services between London and Edinburgh Waverley calling only at Stevenage, Newcastle and Morpeth.

Rolling stock used: Class 803

Future

Proposed Northumberland Line to Ashington 

Proposals to reintroduce passenger rail services between Newcastle Central Station and the communities of south east Northumberland have been discussed since the 1990s. In the early 2010s, Northumberland County Council became interested in the proposals, commissioning Network Rail to complete the first study into the feasibility of the scheme in June 2013. This was followed by a more detailed study, commissioned in June 2015, which confirmed that the reintroduction of a frequent seven-day-a-week passenger service between Newcastle Central and Ashington was feasible and could provide economic benefits of £70million with more than 380,000 people using the line each year by 2034.

Despite a change in the political leadership of Northumberland County Council following the 2017 local elections the authority continued to develop the project, encouraged by the Department for Transport's November 2017 report, A Strategic Vision for Rail, which named the line as a possible candidate for a future reintroduction of passenger services. More detailed plans were announced in July 2019 which would have split the project into four phases to reduce the initial cost of the scheme. In August 2020, it was reported that these four proposed phases might be merged into a single one.

The Department for Transport allocated an initial grant of £1.5million towards the project costs in January 2020 which was supplemented by an allocation of £10million of funds from Northumberland County Council the following month. This funding enabled detailed on-site ground investigation works to begin in October 2020. The allocation of a further £34million of UK Government funding for the project in January 2021 enables the necessary land to be purchased, detailed designs to be prepared and some early preparatory and site works to begin. In January 2021, it was anticipated that the UK Government would fund the remainder of the project cost, estimated at £166million as of January 2021, once the final phase of design works were completed. However, in April 2021, it was reported that government officials were seeking to reduce the cost of the project as part of the Department for Transport's Project SPEED initiative. It was reported that the cost-saving measures under consideration included and cutting initial service frequencies from two to one trains per hour and dropping the proposed Blyth Bebside station from initial project scope (although the latter option was later publicly ruled out by Minister for Railways Chris Heaton-Harris).

Northumberland County Council submitted a Transport and Works Act Order application to the Secretary of State for Transport Grant Shapps on 26 May 2021, under which they would be conferred certain additional powers deemed necessary for the new stations to be constructed and the line upgraded to carry regular passenger services. It is anticipated that the main construction phase might begin as early as June 2022, enabling an opening date in 2024.

Layout and platforms

The station has 12 surface-level platforms, served by heavy rail services, with a further two sub-surface platforms served by the Tyne & Wear Metro network.

Platform 1: A bay platform facing east, serving terminating Northern Trains services from the East Coast Main Line. Following the May 2019 timetable change, this platform is used less frequently, as most Northern Trains services from Morpeth now continue west along the Tyne Valley Line.
Platform 2: The main through platform for CrossCountry and LNER services heading north along the East Coast Main Line towards Edinburgh Waverley.
Platforms 3 & 4: The main through platforms for CrossCountry services heading towards Sheffield, Birmingham New Street, the South East and the South Coast, and LNER services heading south along the East Coast Main Line towards London King's Cross. These platforms are also (less frequently) used by services heading north along the East Coast Main Line, as well as by services terminating at Newcastle.
Platforms 5–8: The four platforms all share the newer island platform, mainly used by Northern Trains services heading west along the Tyne Valley Line towards Hexham and Carlisle, and east along the Durham Coast Line towards Sunderland, Hartlepool and Middlesbrough.
Platforms 9–12: Four bay terminal platforms facing west. Platforms 9 & 10 are used by TransPennine Express services towards Manchester Airport and Liverpool Lime Street, as well as some Northern Trains services heading west along the Tyne Valley Line. Platform 11 is mainly used by CrossCountry services towards Birmingham New Street, the South East and the South Coast. Platform 12 is mainly used by CrossCountry services terminating at Newcastle.

Station redevelopment

Plans were revealed on 30 April 2013 for a major redevelopment, including an £8.6million project to regenerate the inside of the station, and a further £11.4million to develop the area surrounding the station. The portico redevelopment was completed in April 2014.

The redevelopment plans contained a number of changes, including:

New retail space in the portico area, which was glazed to provide weather protection as well as retail units replacing the existing ticket office and travel centre. This double the previous  retail space to make it equivalent to that of  King's Cross Station.
The travel centre and ticket office were reduced in size and relocated to the area beyond the Sainsbury's Local store.
Improved toilet facilities.
Clearer signage.
Increased covered cycle-park space.
A simpler layout that is claimed to accentuate the grade one listed architecture including the Castle Keep. The line of sight across the concourse was also  improved.
Sand-blasting of the walls and new lighting were fitted.
Previous access points to the station were  moved to make it easier to enter and leave the station.
Improved waiting rooms.
Alteration to the existing bridge structure.
New lifts and escalators.
New glazed canopies.

The redevelopment plan also included a number of changes to the area surrounding the station, including:

New taxi rank to the east side of the former portico.
A two-way cycle track at the west end of Neville Street.
Change of traffic flow patterns to ease congestion.
Pedestrian crossings on Neville Street and Grainger Street.
Pedestrianisation of the car-park space outside the Centurion Pub.
Wider footways and pavement cafes outside the station.

The work began in May 2013 and was completed during April 2014 by Miller Construction. The station operated as normal throughout the works. The £8.6million funding for the internal station work was provided by the Department for Transport's Station Commercial Project Facility Fund. The external works were jointly funded by NE1, Regional Growth Fund and Newcastle City Council.

Writing in his 2017 book Britain’s 100 Best Stations, British journalist and author Sir Simon Jenkins described the glazing of the portico and its conversion to retail usage as a “disaster” and ”thoughtless”, saying “What had been epic became anaemic.”

In 2021, a restoration of disused toilet facilities near platform 12, thought to date back to the 1890s, was completed.

Railway infrastructure

Trains cross the River Tyne on one of two bridges. The older High Level Bridge south-east of the station, designed by Robert Stephenson opened on 27 September 1849. Its location meant north–south trains had to reverse in the station to continue their journey. The King Edward VII Bridge south-west of the station opened on 10 July 1906 allowing north–south trains to continue without reversing. The two bridges enable the trackwork north and south of the river to form a complete circle, allowing trains to be turned if necessary. The former Gateshead depot, next to the connecting tracks on the south side of the Tyne, mirrored Newcastle station.

The station was noted for its complex set of diamond crossings to the east of the station which facilitated access to the High Level Bridge and northbound East Coast Main Line and was said to be the greatest such crossing in the world. The crossing was the subject of many early-1900s post cards, titled The Largest Railway Crossing in the World, photographed from the castle (towards the station), or from the station towards the castle.

The crossing has been simplified in recent years as the opening of the Metro brought about the withdrawal of many heavy-rail suburban services and the closure of the bay platforms they operated from on the north side of the station removing the need for such a complex crossing. Much of this work was carried out in 1988–1989 as part of remodelling and resignalling work associated with ECML electrification. A new island platform on the former goods lines was commissioned as part of this work, with signalling control relocated to the Tyneside IECC on the opposite side of the river. Heaton depot is to the north of the station, on the East Coast Main Line.

Accidents and incidents
On 17 August 1951, two electric multiple units experienced a head-on collision after one of them departed against a danger signal. Two people were killed.
On 19 April 1955, a collision occurred between V2 locomotive 60968 and Fairburn tank locomotive No. 42085 on the diamond crossings. Both locomotives were derailed.
On 3 July 1961, there was a significant fire inside the station building. The fire, having started in a cable duct at the peak of rush hour, saw the station's new signalling system put out of operation, delaying main line trains. Nearly 10,000 square foot of the station's roof was destroyed, but luckily no one was hurt.

Tyne & Wear Metro

Newcastle station is located above Central metro station on the Tyne and Wear Metro, one of five underground stations serving the city centre. Central is an interchange between the Yellow and Green lines, and is the last stop prior to crossing the River Tyne towards Gateshead.

See also

North Tyneside Loop

Notes

References

Sources

 A short pamphlet plus fold-out map. The original from which reference has been made is in the North of England Institute of Mining and Mechanical Engineers. It is reference Tracts vol 57 p200ff This contains contemporary information about the early period of railway activity in Newcastle/Gateshead.

Further reading

External links

Newcastle Central Station - Part of the 2000 art exhibition "Stephenson's Legacy." Includes old photographs of the station.

Railway stations in Tyne and Wear
Former North Eastern Railway (UK) stations
Railway stations in Great Britain opened in 1850
Railway stations served by CrossCountry
Railway stations served by London North Eastern Railway
Railway stations served by Lumo
Northern franchise railway stations
Railway stations served by TransPennine Express
Buildings and structures in Newcastle upon Tyne
Grade I listed buildings in Tyne and Wear
Grade I listed railway stations
Neoclassical architecture in England
Transport in Newcastle upon Tyne
William Bell railway stations
DfT Category A stations